This is a list of battles during the First World War in which the Canadian Expeditionary Force participated.

France and Flanders

Other Theatres of War
 Gallipoli Campaign, 1915–16
 Macedonian front, 1915–1917
 Sinai and Palestine Campaign, 1915–16, 1918
 North Russia Intervention, 1918–19
 Persian Campaign, 1918–19
 Siberian Intervention, 1918–19

References

External links

 The Great War – List of Battles and Engagements

Canada
Battles during the First World War
Battles during the First World War
Canada battles